Kharin (masculine) or Kharina (feminine) is a Russian surname.

This surname is shared by the following people:

Kharin 
 Dmitri Kharine (born 1968), Russian former professional footballer turned goalkeeping coach
 Mikhail Kharin (born 1976), Russian professional football coach and a former player
 Pavel Kharin (born 1927), Soviet-Russian sprint canoer
 Sergei Kharin (born 1963), Russian professional ice hockey player
 Vladimir Kharin (footballer) (born 1964), Russian professional football player
 Vladimir Kharin (zoologist) (1957-2013), Russian zoologist, ichthyologist, herpetologist
 Yevgeni Kharin (born 1995), Russian professional football player

Kharina 
 Eudoxia Nikolaevna Kharina, mother of Nikolai Kulikovsky (1881–1958), the second husband of Grand Duchess Olga Alexandrovna of Russia, the sister of Tsar Nicholas II of Russia

Russian-language surnames